Mailchimp, also known as Intuit Mailchimp, is a marketing automation platform and email marketing service. "Mailchimp" is the trade name of its operator, Rocket Science Group, an American company founded in 2001 by Ben Chestnut and Mark Armstrong, with Dan Kurzius joining at a later date.

History

Mailchimp was launched in 2001. The platform was named after one of their most popular e-greetings card characters, and earned a few thousand dollars a month. Mailchimp began as a paid service and added a freemium option in 2009. Within a year, its user base had grown from 85,000 to 450,000. By June 2014, it was sending over 10 billion emails per month on behalf of its users. According to the statistics, more than 600 million emails are sent through the platform every two days.

In 2016, Mailchimp was ranked No. 7 on the Forbes Cloud 100 list. In February 2017, the company was named one of Fast Company's Most Innovative Companies of 2017. In August 2017, it was reported that Mailchimp would be opening offices in Brooklyn and Oakland, California.

In February 2019, Mailchimp acquired LemonStand, a smaller competitor. Mailchimp later announced its plans to shift from mail distribution to offering "a full marketing platform aimed at smaller organizations." This shift includes allowing customers to record and track customer leads within the platform, build landing pages and websites, and run ad retargeting advertisements on Facebook and Instagram. As part of this, Mailchimp acquired the London-based media and magazine company Courier Media, in March 2020, with the stated goal of international growth. The magazine has a readership of 100,000 readers in more than 26 countries.

With founders Armstrong and Chestnut starting the company without outside funding or plans to go public, and never bringing on any outside investors thereafter, Mailchip is considered to be an example of a successfully bootstrapped startup.

Acquisition by Intuit 
After turning down repeated acquisition offers for 20 years, Bloomberg reported on August 31, 2021, that Mailchip was talking with Intuit about being acquired. On September 13, 2021, Intuit confirmed it would acquire Mailchimp for approximately $12 billion in cash and stock. On November 1, 2021, Intuit officially completed the acquisition for $5.7bn in cash, $6.3bn in common stock, and 573,000 restricted stock units.

Marketing campaigns 
As an early podcast advertiser, Mailchimp sponsored the launch of Serial, a podcast exploring a murder case over multiple episodes. One ad became memorable for its inclusion of an unscripted mispronunciation of the company's name  "MailKimp"  as spoken by a 14-year-old girl from Norway waiting in line for an iPhone 6. The ad was parodied and "MailKimp" became a meme. In response, Mailchimp bought the domain name mailkimp.com and redirected traffic to mailchimp.com.

In 2018, Mailchimp underwent a brand redesign to help visually demonstrate an evolution from an email marketing tool to a larger marketing platform. This redesign included an updated logo, color palette, typeface, new imagery, and illustrations. It updated the Mailchimp wordmark to "Mailchimp" rather than "MailChimp" with an uppercase letter "C".

Transactional email 
In February 2016, Mailchimp announced it was merging Mandrill transactional email service into Mailchimp as an add-on feature, and gave customers 60-days notice to switch to the new pricing structure or find an alternative service platform. The new pricing structure required a paid Mailchimp plan before being able to purchase Mandrill credits, resulting in customers paying for two products to access Mandrill.

Previously, customers were able to purchase Mandrill credits for sending emails without signing up on Mailchimp. The credits were originally priced at $9.95 for 25,000 emails but increased to $20 for the same number of emails under the new pricing scheme. In addition to needing to purchase Mandrill credits, customers now need to be on a paid Mailchimp monthly plan (the minimum monthly plan being $10 a month), even if the customer has no need for Mailchimp services and only wants access to Mandrill. Mandrill was later renamed Mailchimp Transactional.

Data breach 

In March 2022, Mailchimp suffered a data breach whereby intruders gained access to the data of 319 of their customers through social engineering. The exposed data includes email address, IP address, and the approximate location of their mailing list recipients.

In January 2023, Mailchimp confirmed another breach of data for 133 accounts via social engineering.

See also
 Customer engagement
 Electronic mailing list
 Email marketing
 Email spam
 Marketing

References 

Email marketing software
Digital marketing companies of the United States
Cloud applications
Companies based in Atlanta
Companies based in Fulton County, Georgia
2021 mergers and acquisitions
Marketing companies established in 2001
American companies established in 2001
2001 establishments in Georgia (U.S. state)
Intuit
American corporate subsidiaries